Jharna Basak (born 17 August 1946), known by her stage name Shabnam, is a Bangladeshi–Pakistani stage and film actress. Actor Waheed Murad introduced her to the Pakistani film industry by offering her a lead role in his film Samundar in 1968. Shabnam remained active in Lollywood in the 1960s, 1970s, and 1980s. She has been nominated for Nigar awards several times, winning it 13 times (the most for an actress). She has appeared in over 150 films films. She was a leading actress in the Pakistani film industry for 28 years.

Shabnam migrated from East to West Pakistan in 1968, and lived in the country until the late 1990s, later she returned to her native Bangladesh.

Early life
Shabnam was born on 17 August 1946 in Dhaka, in the erstwhile British India in a Bengali Hindu family. Her father was Nani Basak, a football referee from Dhaka. As a young girl, she was more adventurous and tomboyish in nature in comparison to her sister, who was into singing. She would still practice dance moves. She was offered a role in a movie as a supporting dancer, thus beginning her career in arts.

Career

Shabnam began her career when her father got her admitted into the Bulbul Lalitakala Academy. A close friend of her father got her a role in a dance sequence in the movie "Ei Desh Tomar Amar". Her next role was as a dancer in the movie "Rajdhanir Bukey". When the song became a hit, the audience requested that she be cast as a lead actress. That was when she starred in her Bengali debut film as a heroine, Harano Din.

Shabnam moved to West Pakistan after the director Ehtesham cast her in his Urdu movie Chanda in the erstwhile West Pakistan. Since her Urdu wasn't that proficient at that point in time, the rehearsals were scripted in Bengali. The music of this film was composed by her husband Robin Ghosh. The film turned out to be a hit, starting her career in the top ranks of the Pakistan film industry.

After starring in dozens of super-hit films, Shabnam became the number one reigning actress in Pakistan by the early 1970s. She retained that position until the mid-1980s, when she slowly started to retire. She is considered to probably be the only film actress in the world to have continuously and successfully played the romantic lead in films for almost three decades, from the early 1960s to the late 1980s.

After the Bangladesh Liberation War had ended, Shabnam wanted to visit her native homeland. It took her two years to get the "No Objection Certificate" which was required for her to get a Bangladeshi visa. It was later revealed that Lollywood had requested the Foreign Ministry of Pakistan to not give her a visa, as they feared she would not return from Bangladesh. Nevertheless, she reassured her fans and colleagues that she would not abandon Pakistan, and would be back after visiting her parents. Only then did the Foreign Ministry let her leave Pakistan, making sure their most popular actress would not leave. 
Around 1988, she switched on to character acting and was again doing films in her native Dhaka and Lahore. Since 1987 she made London her place of residence. Shabnam left Pakistan and its film industry in the late 1990s. She gracefully retired and moved to Bangladesh in 1997. According to her, she retired because of her age, and her duty to look after her parents, as they were entering their last years. She planned on retiring after her super-hit blockbuster film Aaina. But because of the overwhelming number of fans and offers she had in Pakistan, it took her 20 years to finish her last films, and then enter retirement.

After returning to Dhaka and taking a break for 2 years, Shabnam lastly performed in movie 'Ammajan,’ directed by Kazi Hayat. She performed in that movie in the central role and it was released in 1999. The film went on to be a super-hit and one of the most successful movies in Bangladeshi film history.

In 2012, Shabnam visited Pakistan along with her husband after 13 years, where they were awarded lifetime achievement award by the Pakistani government. The award ceremony was organized by PTV. The function was hosted by prominent actress and television presenter Bushra Ansari. The function included live interviews of she and her husband, along with famous singers and co-artists of the duo. Many of Shabnam's and Robin Ghosh's songs were performed on stage by young Pakistani artists. The show was attended by top members of the Pakistani community, most notably the then Prime Minister of Pakistan, Yousaf Raza Gillani.

23 of her Urdu movies celebrated diamond jubilees in Lollywood. Shabnam was the heroine among 12 of those movies. Shabnam won 13 Nigar Awards for best actress, which is a record to date.

In 2017, Shabnam announced that she would be returning to the Pakistani entertainment industry with television series Mohini Mansion Ki Cinderellayain, which is directed by Ali Tahir, and its music is composed by Sahir Ali Bagga. She is also committed to star in Aina 2, a sequel to her 1977 film Aina, which will be directed by Syed Noor.

Personal life 
Shabnam married music composer Robin Ghosh in 1966. Together they had one son; Ronnie Ghosh. Robin Ghosh died on 13 February 2016 in Dhaka, due to respiratory failures. In an interview, she described him as a loving, caring and very understanding person who never interfered in her film life and never asked questions when she came home late from work. After retirement from the film industry, she used to take care of her parents and her husband, until their deaths. She now leads a retired life as a housewife, in Dhaka.

1978 assault
Farooq Bandial (a politician from Punjab's Khushab district) along with other four men committed armed dacoity at the house of Shabnam in Gulberg area of Lahore on 13 May 1978. A Special Military Court handed Bandial and four other men death sentences for committing armed dacoity. The accused were later commuted by General Muhammad Zia-ul-Haq after Robin Ghosh and Shabnam granted them a pardon, and it was later changed to a life sentence. Bhandial joined Imran Khan's PTI in 2018, but was expelled the same day after news of his involvement in the dacoity re-surfaced. Dr. S.M. Zafar served as the legal counsel for Robin Ghosh and Shabnam in their case. The details of the case were recounted in detail in his book Mere Mashhoor Muqaddamay (My Popular Cases).

Filmography
Shabnam worked in a total of 170 films, including 152 Urdu films, 14 Bengali and 4 Punjabi films. Her unreleased films include: Gharonda, Bunjarun and Itna Pyar Kon Karay. Her debut film was a Bengali film. Her first Urdu film, Chanda (1962 film) was filmed in Bangladesh.

References

External links
 

1946 births
Living people
People from Dhaka
Pakistani film actresses
Bangladeshi film actresses
Bangladeshi Hindus
Bangladeshi stage actresses
20th-century Pakistani actresses
21st-century Pakistani actresses
Pakistani emigrants to Bangladesh
Pakistani Hindus
Pakistani people of Bengali descent
Pakistani television actresses
Nigar Award winners